is an artist based in London.

Tsuchiya  was born in 1972 in Yokohama, Japan. She studied art at Accademia di Belle Arti Firenze and the Goldsmiths, University of London. She makes sculptures out of found scraps of household objects. Nobuko begins her work by collecting items she's intuitively attracted to; then combines them into a polymer like structure, which are then cast. Her work was included in the 50th Venice Biennale in 2003.

References

External links
Further information from the Saatchi Gallery
Nobuko Tsuchiya at Anthony Reynolds
Nobuko Tsuchiya at Galerie Aline Vidal
Nobuko Tsuchiya at SCAI The Bathhouse

1972 births
Living people
Japanese women sculptors
21st-century sculptors
21st-century Japanese women artists
People from Yokohama
Accademia di Belle Arti di Firenze alumni
Alumni of Goldsmiths, University of London
21st-century Japanese artists